Richmond, also known as Warrenton, is an unincorporated community in Dallas County, Alabama, United States.  Richmond gained its name from Richmond County, New York, the birthplace for several early settlers, most notably the Crocherons.  Richmond has one site included on the National Register of Historic Places, the Street Manual Training School.  Elm Bluff Plantation, owned by John Jay Crocheron, is nearby in Elm Bluff.

References

Unincorporated communities in Alabama
Unincorporated communities in Dallas County, Alabama